Landscape is an album by pianist Kenny Barron which was recorded in 1984 and first released on the Japanese Baystate label.

Reception 

In his review on Allmusic, Ken Dryden stated "Kenny Barron emerged during the 1980s as one of the dominant pianists in his field, recording a series of first-rate releases for a variety of labels in the U.S., Europe, and Japan ... This first-rate effort will be appreciated by any fan of the great Kenny Barron".

Track listing 
All compositions by Kenny Barron except where noted.

 "Hush-a-Bye" (Traditional) – 7:46
 "Spring Is Here" (Richard Rodgers, Lorenz Hart) – 8:15
 "Kōjō no Tsuki" (Rentarō Taki, Bansui Tsuchii) – 8:40
 "Ringo Oiwake" (Fujio Ozawa, Masao Yoneyama) – 6:02
 "Calypso" – 4:39
 "Dear Old Stockholm" (Traditional) – 5:56
 "Sunset" – 5:58

Personnel 
Kenny Barron – piano
Cecil McBee – bass
Al Foster – drums

References 

Kenny Barron albums
1985 albums
Baystate Records albums